Joseph Paul "Joe" Kolter (September 3, 1926 – September 8, 2019) was an American politician who served as a Democratic member of the United States House of Representatives for Pennsylvania from 1983 to 1993.

Early life and career
Kolter was born in McDonald, Ohio. He graduated from New Brighton High School in 1944 and Geneva College in 1950.

He served in the United States Army Air Forces from 1944 to 1947.

He was a New Brighton city councilman from 1961 to 1965, and a member of the Pennsylvania House of Representatives from 1969 to 1982.

Congress
A Democrat, Kolter was elected to the U.S. House of Representatives in 1982, defeating incumbent Eugene Atkinson, a Republican who had been elected twice as a Democrat, but switched parties in 1981. He was reelected four times, before he was defeated in the Democratic primary by Ron Klink in 1992.

Ethics and legal issues
Kolter was implicated in the Congressional Post Office scandal that also ensnared Ways and Means Committee chairman Dan Rostenkowski of Illinois. He pleaded guilty to conspiring with the House Postmaster to embezzle $9,300 in taxpayer funds and received a six-month prison sentence. Kolter was also fined $20,000 and ordered to pay restitution for the amount converted.

Death
Kolter died on September 8, 2019, at the age of 93, in Harrisburg, Pennsylvania.

See also
List of American federal politicians convicted of crimes
List of federal political scandals in the United States

References

External links

Joseph P. Kolter biography. Pennsylvania House of Representatives, Historical Biographies.

1926 births
2019 deaths
American people of Yugoslav descent
Democratic Party members of the United States House of Representatives from Pennsylvania
Geneva College alumni
Democratic Party members of the Pennsylvania House of Representatives
Military personnel from Pennsylvania
Pennsylvania city council members
Pennsylvania politicians convicted of crimes
People from New Brighton, Pennsylvania
People from Trumbull County, Ohio
Politicians convicted of conspiracy to defraud the United States
United States Army Air Forces personnel of World War II